This is a list of results of National Football League games played on ESPN Sunday Night Football. In 1987, the NFL began regularly scheduling games for Sunday nights to be aired on ESPN during the second half of the season. The league expanded these games to the entire season in 1990, though the first half of the season was televised on TNT, while ESPN continued to carry the second half. In 1998, ESPN took over the entire season's slate of games. The network also aired occasional Thursday and Saturday night games when they were scheduled (some of these games were either to avoid conflicts with the World Series, or because Sunday was Christmas Eve).

1980s

1987

1988

The December 18 game between the San Francisco 49ers and Los Angeles Rams featured the Rams clinching the final NFC wild card, eliminating the New York Giants and New Orleans Saints from playoff contention. Giants quarterback Phil Simms accused the 49ers of losing intentionally to put an end to the Giants' season.

1989
The November 5 game between the Dallas Cowboys and Washington Redskins would be the only win for the Cowboys during the 1989 season.

The December 23 game was played on that day in particular because the Sunday that weekend was Christmas Eve, which the NFL avoids playing on for night games. The same thing happened in 1995 and 2000.

1990s

1990

1991

1992

1993
The January 2 game between the Houston Oilers and New York Jets is best remembered for an incident near halftime when Oilers defensive coordinator Buddy Ryan punched offensive coordinator Kevin Gilbride.

1994

1995

1996

1997
The November 23 game between the New York Giants and Washington Redskins ended in a rare 7-7 tie which was the first and only ESPN Sunday Night Football tie in series history.

1998

1999

2000s

2000

2001

2002

2003
The December 14 game between the New York Giants and New Orleans Saints is remembered for an incident where, after scoring a touchdown, Saints wide receiver Joe Horn grabbed a cell phone hidden under the goalpost padding and pretended to make a phone call. resulting in a 15-yard unsportsmanlike conduct penalty and Horn being fined $30,000 by the NFL.

2004

2005

See also
ESPN Sunday Night Football
Monday Night Football results (1970–1989)
Monday Night Football results (1990–2009)
Monday Night Football results (2010–present)
NBC Sunday Night Football results (2006–present)
Thursday Night Football results (2006–present)
TNT Sunday Night Football results (1990–1997)

National Football League lists
Sunday Night Football
National Football League on television results
Sunday Night Football results (1987-2005)